The 1879 Clare by-election was fought on 15 May 1879.  The byelection was fought due to the resignation of the incumbent Home Rule MP, Bryan O'Loghlen, to become Attorney General of the Colony of Victoria. It was won by the Home Rule candidate James Patrick Mahon.

References

By-elections to the Parliament of the United Kingdom in County Clare constituencies
1879 elections in the United Kingdom
Unopposed by-elections to the Parliament of the United Kingdom (need citation)
1879 elections in Ireland